Mangalore Institute of Technology and Engineering (MITE) is an engineering and management institution located in Mangalore, India, established by the Rajalaxmi Education Trust under the leadership of Rajesh Chouta in 2007. The institute is affiliated to the Visvesvaraya Technological University, Belgaum, and approved by the All India Council of Technical Education (AICTE), New Delhi. MITE, established in 2007, today stands tall with 3000+ students, 180+ Faculty, offering 9 Undergraduate Programs in Engineering, 1 Post Graduate Program in Engineering, Masters of Computer Applications, Master of Business Administration (MBA) and 7 research programs. 
MITE is accredited by National Assessment and Accreditation Council (NAAC) with A+ Grade, a CGPA Score of 3.44 out of 4.

Campus 
MITE is on the Mangalore - Solapur Highway, about 30 km from Mangalore and about 4 km short of the town of Moodabidri. It was awarded the ‘Best Engineering College undertaking Green initiatives in Dakshina Kannada’ by the Pollution Control Board Government of Karnataka.

Accreditation 
MITE is committed to promote and propagate quality education on par with international standards; to groom young minds and turn them into professionals with high intellectual capabilities and strong moral values. Accreditation’s are true 360-degree measure of quality processes at an Institution. Accreditation is an acknowledgement to the competence and credibility of an institution. It is also a reference to the fact that the institution is in par with Institutions of eminence and quality is the face of the organization.
The institute is accredited by National Assessment and Accreditation Council (NAAC) with A+ grade(3.44 CGPA) in 2021 for a span of 5 years. The accreditation takes into account the teaching process, research facilities, infrastructure, research aptitude, support for beyond curricular activities, organizational structure, and contribution of the institution to the society.

NBA accreditation is an assurance that students at MITE receive an education which is a balance between high academic quality and professional relevance and that the needs of the corporate world are well integrated into programs, activities, and processes which promotes quality professional education. The following departments are accredited by National Board of Accreditation 
Computer Science & Engineering
Electronics & Communications Engineering
Mechanical Engineering
Aeronautical Engineering
Civil Engineering
Mechatronics

Courses 
Institute offers 4-year bachelor's degree and 2-year masters's degree programmes

B.E. Degree courses:
Computer Science & Engineerin
Information Science & Engineering
Artificial Intelligence & Machine Learning
Computer Sc. & Engg (IoT & Cybersecurity with Blockchain technology)
Electronics & Communications Engineering
Mechatronics Engineering
Mechanical Engineering
Aeronautical Engineering
Civil Engineering

Postgraduate level:
M Tech in Computer Science
MCA-Master of Computer Applications
MBA-Masters in Business Administration
The course is spread over four semesters with the following Dual specialization in the Management sector
Human Resource Management
Marketing
Finance

Library 
MITE has a fully computerized library, centrally air-conditioned library with rich collections of books and periodicals. MITE has a fully computerized centrally air-conditioned library spread across Two levels, with a rich collection of books and periodicals. The Library has a collection of 5,206 Titles, 26,910 Volumes, most of the Standard National and International Journals of Engineering and Management Stream. MITE has been a member of the National Digital Library (NDL) since the academic year 2016-2017. The National Digital Library of India (NDLI) is a virtual repository of learning resources with search/browse facilities and provides a host of services for the learning enthusiastic community including Researchers, Scholars and students for general learning.

Industry Collaboration 
MITE has always strived towards orienting students to standards that would make them globally competent and employable by providing appropriate value added programs and industrial certifications. Industry linkage with the Institution bridges the education-employability gap effectively. The alliance with industry complements the curriculum, enhances their capability and presents them with great avenues that would act as a launch-pad for their successful career. MITE has Strong Industry Collaborations and established Centers ofExcellence and Learning Programs through MoU with Global Companies like SIEMENS, Bosch Rexroth, Salesforce, UiPath, KPIT, Infosys Campus Connect, Toyota Industries Engine India Pvt LTd, Carl Zeiss, National Highways Authority of India.

Innovation Ecosystem 
MITE has set up a conducive ecosystem for the startup culture to flourish with the best infrastructure, training, and mentorship. The Entrepreneurship Development Cell strives to identify, nurture and support budding entrepreneurs. The extensive efforts of the cell have shown results with a large number of Alumni starting their independent ventures. The institution indeed takes pride in the shaping young Men & Women who aspire to change the future and be part of their journey. The endeavors of MITE to shape young business icons of tomorrow got the lift with the grants from Government of India and the state Government of Karnataka. The grant of over INR. 2 Crores is in fact turning dreams for young engineers who wish to start own their own, offering wings to their dreams. 20 student innovative ideas, from Two different Phases, are incubated at MITE and have received seed funding of up to 3 Lakhs for prototype development.

References 

Educational institutions established in 2007
Engineering colleges in Mangalore
Affiliates of Visvesvaraya Technological University
2007 establishments in Karnataka